Ian Blake may refer to:

Ian Blake (rugby union), played for Kilmarnock RFC
Ian Blake, character in American Yearbook
Ian Blake, character in Y Pris
Ian Blake, pseudonym for singer-songwriter Draco Rosa
Ian Blake, British/Australian composer and musician